Anne Macky (1887-1964) was an Australian composer, pianist, occultist, student of and coauthor with Aleister Crowley of the influential Crowleian book on Thelemic magick, Magick Without Tears.

Music
Macky established the People's Conservatorium in 1917 in Melbourne and managed it until she emigrated to England in 1932. While in England, Macky studied composition with the composer and teacher Arthur Willner. After returning to Australia in 1946, she composed numerous works that were regularly performed in Melbourne, and occasionally broadcast on Australian radio.

Anthroposophy
In 1922, Macky became committed to Anthroposophy as a result of hearing lectures given by Rudolf Steiner at the Oxford Conference. Macky established, together with the Italian artist Ernesto Genoni, regular Anthroposophy meetings in Melbourne from 1928 and they founded the Michael Group, a branch of the Anthroposophical Society in Melbourne in 1932.

Collaboration with Aleister Crowley
Crowley's Magick Without Tears was begun in 1943 and consists of Crowley's answers to questions from "an unnamed female pupil", referred to in the magical literature as The Unknow Soror. The primary correspondent was Anne Macky, whose A∴ A∴ motto was Fiat Yod.

On 18 August she informed him in a letter that her motto was in fact Fiat and the letter four, which is Yod, producing Soror "Fiat Yod", (811+20=831). It's interesting that the motto he came up with for her and the one she discovered on her own have the exact same numeration. Crowley accepted Fiat Yod as her motto and she is often referenced by a simple "FY" in his journals from that point on.

In late June 1943, Anne Macky's correspondence with Aleister Crowley shows they discussed magick and a certain Rite. From the information in his journals we can say she was undoubtedly a member of the A∴A∴ and was interested in joining the O.T.O. He sent her O.T.O contact information for people who would initiate her into the order. She inquired further requesting more personal information about these members and he responded by telling her that the Path is an individual one, that the O.T.O. was not a social organization.

In his journals Crowley states that he struck a bargain with Anne Macky. He paid her the sum of 20 pounds on 26 October 1943. She was to write 50 letters with questions for him to answer and they would eventually be put into a book, Magick Without Tears. She accepted, and by 10 November of that same year he was working on responding to her eighth letter.

At times they argued over the content of the letters and money. Eventually she also requested a copy of the completed book as payment. By 16 November he began referring to Anne as "Mrs Mother Murrmbidgee". Yet he visited him in person again just two days later and she brought with her a "lovely spray of orchids, white, yellow and purple" and he made comments about the "8 and 90 rules of art".

Thirty letters between Aleister Crowley and Anne Macky were set up for auction. In one of those letters Crowley said to Anne Macky "…I find a whole lot of thoughts in your mind which were not explicitly stated in so many words, and all the deeper and more important for that. I really do have to thank you most heartily – you have given me such a shaking up…"

"I am arranging to send you the official papers connected to the O.T.O. but the idea that you should meet other members first is quite impossible. Even after affiliation, you would not meet anyone unless it were necessary for you to work in cooperation with them. I am afraid you have still got the idea that the Great Work is a tea-party. Contact with other students only means that you criticize their hats, and then their morals; and I am not going to encourage this. Your work is not anybody else’s; and undirected chatter is the worst poisonous element in a humane society"-Aleister Crowley, Magick Without Tears.

"One thing is certain, it is safe to say that the “Unknown Soror” mentioned by Karl Germer in his introduction to Magick Without Tears, undoubtedly now has a name, and she is Anne Macky, Soror Fiat Yod."

References

Citations

Works cited

External links 
 Anne Macky at Astrum Argenteum

1887 births
1964 deaths
20th-century classical composers
Anthroposophists
Australian classical composers
Australian classical pianists
Australian women pianists
Australian women classical composers
Composers for piano
Women classical pianists
20th-century women composers
20th-century women pianists